Potamonautes ignestii is a species of crustacean in the family Potamonautidae. It is found in Ethiopia.

References

Endemic fauna of Ethiopia
Potamoidea
Freshwater crustaceans of Africa
Arthropods of Ethiopia
Crustaceans described in 1923
Taxonomy articles created by Polbot